Mother, I Love You is a 2013 Latvian drama film written and directed by Jānis Nords. The film was selected as the Latvian entry for the Best Foreign Language Film at the 86th Academy Awards, but it was not nominated.

Cast
 Kristofers Konovalovs as Raimonds
 Vita Vārpiņa as Raimonds' mother
 Matīss Livčāns as Pēteris
 Indra Briķe as Pēteris' mother

Awards
 Grand Prix of the International Jury of the program Generation KPlus at the Berlin Film Festival
 Best Feature Film Award at the Los Angeles Film Festival
 Best European Film Award at the Zlin Film Festival for Children and Youth, Czech Republic.

See also
 List of submissions to the 86th Academy Awards for Best Foreign Language Film
 List of Latvian submissions for the Academy Award for Best Foreign Language Film

References

External links
 

2013 films
2013 drama films
Latvian drama films
Latvian-language films